The 2016 European U23 Judo Championships is an edition of the European U23 Judo Championships, organised by the European Judo Union. It was held in Tel Aviv, Israel from 11 to 12 November 2016.

Medal summary

Medal table

Men's events

Women's events

Source Results

References

External links
 

European U23 Judo Championships
 U23
European Championships, U23
Judo
European Championships 2016, U23
Judo
Judo, European Championships U23